Sugarloaf is the debut album by American rock band Sugarloaf. It was released in 1970 and reached No. 24 on the Billboard Top LPs chart. It is best known for the No. 3 hit single "Green-Eyed Lady".

Reception

In his retrospective review for Allmusic, critic Jim Newsom wrote that, aside from the hit "Green Eyed Lady", the album was "mostly generic rock of its era" and side two was "instantly forgettable."

Track listing

Personnel
Jerry Corbetta - organ, piano, clavichord, vocals
Bob Webber - guitar, vocals
Bob Raymond - bass
Myron Pollock - drums
Bob MacVittie - drums (on Green-Eyed Lady)
Veeder van Dorn -vocals on West of Tomorrow and Things Are Gonna Change Some
Technical
Paul Buff - engineer
Ron Wolin - art direction, design
Howard Risk - photography
Langdon Winner - liner notes

References

1970 debut albums
Sugarloaf (band) albums
Liberty Records albums